Betta stiktos is a species of gourami. It is native to Asia, where it occurs in the Mekong basin in Cambodia. The species reaches 2.8 cm (1.1 inches) in standard length and is known to be a facultative air-breather. It is sometimes seen in the aquarium trade, and the species was reportedly feared to be possibly extinct prior to its reappearance within the trade.

References 

Species described in 2005
Freshwater fish of Asia
Osphronemidae
Fish of Cambodia
Taxa named by Heok Hui Tan